Carla (Mari) Trujillo is an American fiction writer, noted for her first novel What Night Brings, about the cultural contradictions of a Chicana lesbian growing up in a Catholic home. She is an administrator at the University of California, Berkeley, and has taught courses in Women's Studies.

Early life 
Trujillo was born in New Mexico, and lived there for several years before moving to Northern California. There, her grandmother ran a grocery store in the town of Las Vegas where Trujillo spent many days as a child playing. Trujillo would later use these early memories as inspiration for her works such as Faith and Fat Chances and Dogtown which both carry messages about class struggle and the impact of gentrification. Her grandmother's store was eventually claimed as eminent domain and paved over to make way for a highway, which meant the loss of income she used to support her seven children.

As an adult, Trujillo still prioritizes annual visits to New Mexico; in an interview about her book Faith and Fat Chances, Trujillo observed, “I feel very connected to the land, to the people and the spirit of the country...It’s always been a part of my life.

Career 
Trujillo studied human development at the University of California, Davis. After earning her Bachelor's degree, she went on to graduate school at the University of Wisconsin, Madison, where she earned her PhD in Education Psychology. It was during her time in graduate school that her writing became an integral part of her daily life. She eventually moved to Berkeley, California, where she is currently an administrator at the University of California, Berkeley. She has lectured on Ethnic Studies, both at U.C. Berkeley and also Mills College in Oakland, California. She has also taught courses in Women's Studies at San Francisco State University. She is the former Director of the Graduate Diversity Program at U.C. Berkley. In 2003, Trujillo authored her first novel entitled What Night Brings and published it with Curbstone Press. What Night Brings focuses on the Chicana lesbian character, Marci Cruz, and her upbringing in a conservative Catholic home in 1960s Northern California.  Through the fictionalized account of Cruz, Trujillo questions issues of patriarchy and homophobia within Chicana/o culture.

Editorial Work 
In 1991, Trujillo embarked on editing for Chicana Lesbians: The Girls Our Mothers Warned Us About, an anthology of essays and articles by Chicana Lesbian writers. Her inspiration for editing Chicana Lesbians came from the work of other anthologies; Trujillo noted that reading Juanita Ramos's Compañeras: Latina Lesbians motivated her to expand upon the knowledge of Chicana Lesbian experiences. As she later explained, she "wanted to see more about the intricacies and specifics of lesbianism and our culture," for her this meant incorporating writings which discussed issues such as racism and familial rejection of identity. Chicana Lesbians would later be awarded with the Lambda Literary Award for Best Lesbian Anthology.

In 1997, she edited and published Living Chicana Theory, a collection of works addressing Chicana subjectivity. The variety of works included in the anthology ranged from theoretical to more artistic forms of critique; some notable contributors included Teresa Córdova, Gloria Anzaldúa, and Antonia Castañeda. The anthology interrogates the presence of coloniality in the academy as well as Chicanx culture at large, and explores meanings of identity construction in Chicana lives.

Awards 
 Lambda Literary Award for Best Lesbian Anthology for Chicana Lesbians: The Girls Our Mothers Warned Us About (1991, won - editor)
 PEN Bellwether Prize for Faith and Fat Chances (2012 - Finalist)

Bibliography 
 What Night Brings (2003)
 Faith and Fat Chances (2015)

As editor 
 Chicana Lesbians: The Girls Our Mothers Warned Us About (1991)
 Living Chicana Theory (1997)

References

American women novelists
American lesbian writers
American writers of Mexican descent
21st-century American novelists
Year of birth missing (living people)
Living people
21st-century American women writers
University of California, Davis alumni
21st-century American LGBT people